Constitutional Assembly elections were held in South Vietnam on 11 September 1966. A total of 532 candidates contested the 117 seats. The Assembly drafted and approved a new constitution, which was promulgated the following year.

Electoral system
The electoral system used the 44 provinces of South Vietnam as districts. Each province was one district, except the city of Saigon, which was divided into three districts, and Gia Định, which was divided into two districts. Provinces that elected more than one member used proportional representation with seats allocated using the d'Hondt method, while provinces that only elected one member used the first-past-the-post system.

Results

References

South Vietnam
Elections in South Vietnam
Constitutional Assembly election
Election and referendum articles with incomplete results